The Roland VP-330 is a paraphonic ten band vocoder and string machine manufactured by Roland Corporation from 1979 to 1980.  While there are several string machines and vocoders, a single device combining the two is rare, despite the advantage of paraphonic vocoding, and the VP-330's synthetic choir sounds are unique.  Despite the VP-330's electronic string and choir sounds being less realistic than those of the tape-based Mellotron, touring musicians used it as a lighter and more robust alternative.

The Roland SVC-350 is a similar vocoder in rack-mount form designed to accept external inputs.

Architecture

In addition to vocoding and generating string sounds, the VP-330 can also play four different choir sounds, each of which uses four bandpass filters, shared from the same pool of seven total.  Like Roland's other string machines of the era, such as the RS-202, it features a BBD-based ensemble effect that thickens the strings, and optionally the choirs and vocoder.

Notable users

 10cc
 Laurie Anderson (on O Superman)
 BT
 Michael Boddicker (on Michael Jackson's P.Y.T. (Pretty Young Thing))
 A Certain Ratio
 Vince Clarke
 Phil Collins
 John Foxx
 Yvan Guilini
 Greg Hawkes (of The Cars)
 Tony Mansfield
 Mike Oldfield
 Queen
 Isao Tomita
 Underworld
 Vangelis (including on the Chariots of Fire and Blade Runner soundtracks)
 Yellow Magic Orchestra

Legacy

In 2016, Roland made a digital recreation of the VP-330, named the VP-03, as part of their Boutique range.  In 2019, Behringer released their own VP-330 clone, the VC340.

References

	
	

	
	
	
	
	
	
	

Musical instruments invented in the 1970s
VP-330
Analog synthesizers
Polyphonic synthesizers